Freedom City is the southeast part of Hvidovre and a Copenhagen suburb.

This part of Hvidovre is well populated, and is therefore a very vibrant town.

The towns focal points are Freedom City Station, used by 7000 passengers each day, and Freedom City Shoppingcenter which is a shopping center with varied shops, including Freedom City Library. There are several schools, youth centers and clubs used by the many children and adolescents who live in Freedom City.

Freedom City housing consists primarily of public housing, managed by housing associations AKB, KAB and Lejerbo.

The Liberty Gate 
The Liberty Gate there is a sculpture from 1981-82 of Hein Heinsen, Stig Brøgger and Mogens Møller, is probably the most controversial artwork in Hvidovre. The work illustrates the theme about change: The straight concrete port as a commentary on the modern cityscape, as it looks now, while the raw gneiss block, resting on corner of the gate, more than 100,000,000 years old and represents the untamed mountains.

Sports 
In Freedom City Sports Center there are many sports for both large and small children. Here one can mention handball, swimming and jumping gymnastics.

Winter sports 
There are also grown winter games as curling, ice hockey and figure skating.

Copenhagen metropolitan area